Nikodim (or Nikodeme) Pavlovich Kondakov (1 (13) November 1844, Olshanka, Kursk Governorate, Russian Empire– 17 February 1925, Prague, Czechoslovakia), was an art historian with special expertise in the history of Russian and Serbian Christian icons. He is remembered as a pioneer among art historian who studied the trasures of Mount Athos like Frenchman Gabriel Millet.

Biography
Nicodem Pavlovitch Kondakov was born in the Russian Empire in 1844, in the village of Khalan in Kursk Governorate. He attended Moscow University under Fedor Buslaev from 1861 to 1865.

After graduation he taught in the Moscow Art School.

In 1870 he became a lecturer in the University of Novorossia, Odessa (now Odessa National University, Ukraine), and in 1877 a professor there.

From 1888 he taught in St. Petersburg University. From 1893 he was a member of the Russian Academy of Fine Arts, and from 1898 a member of the Russian Academy of Sciences. In 1895 with Fyodor Uspensky he founded the Russian Archaeological Institute of Constantinople.

During the Revolution of 1917 and the Civil War in Russia Kondakov lived in Odessa and Yalta (see: South Russia (1919–1920)).

In 1920 he emigrated to Bulgaria, and then to Czechoslovakia, where he taught in Prague University until his death in 1925.

In his first book, on Greek manuscript illumination, published in 1877, Kondakov approached the stylistic evolution of eastern Romanesque art  through the use of artistic ideal. He collaborated with Salomon Reinach in Antiquités de la Russie Méridionale (1891). His lectures  influenced future historians, among others, Michael Rostovtzeff. Kondakov wrote numerous works on the history of Ancient Greek, Russian, Georgian and Eastern Roman art. He founded the modern method in the history of the art of the Eastern Roman Empire.

See also
 Stevan Dimitrijević
 Gabriel Millet
 Ljuba Kovačević
 Ljubomir Stojanović
 Vladimir Ćorović
 Alexander Solovyev

Further reading
Klejn, Leo. 'Nikodim Pavlovich Kondakov, 1844–1925', in Encyclopedia of Archaeology, Part I, The Great Archaeologists. Santa-Barbara, CA; Denver, CO; Oxford, England: ABC-Clio, 1999 (hardcover), Vol. I, pp. 165–174.
Ivan Foletti,  From Byzantium to Holy Russia Nikodim Kondakov (1844-1925) and the Invention of the Icon, Roma: Viella 2017,

External links
Iconography of Mother of God, vol. 1–2. Saint Petersburg 1914; Prague 1915 
History of Byzantine Miniature Painting (1876/2012) 

1844 births
1925 deaths
People from Belgorod Oblast
People from Novooskolsky Uyezd
Members of the Russian Assembly
Privy Councillor (Russian Empire)
Historians from the Russian Empire
Archaeologists from the Russian Empire
Russian art historians
Medievalists from the Russian Empire
Byzantinists from the Russian Empire
Historians of Byzantine art
Imperial Moscow University alumni
Academic staff of Saint Petersburg State University
Full members of the Saint Petersburg Academy of Sciences
Full Members of the Russian Academy of Sciences (1917–1925)
Members of the Macedonian Scientific Institute
Recipients of the Order of St. Vladimir, 3rd class
Recipients of the Order of St. Anna, 1st class
Recipients of the Order of St. Anna, 2nd class
Recipients of the Order of Saint Stanislaus (Russian), 1st class
Recipients of the Order of Saint Stanislaus (Russian), 2nd class
White Russian emigrants to Bulgaria
White Russian emigrants to Czechoslovakia
Burials at Olšany Cemetery